International Francophonie Day is observed within the International Organization of La Francophonie's 77 member states every March 20 to celebrate the French language and Francophone culture. There are over 369 million French speakers on Earth.

Created in 1988, the date celebrates the signing of the Niamey Convention in Niger on 20 March 1970. The convention established the Agence de Coopération Culturelle et Technique, the precursor to the International Organization of La Francophonie.

Just like the British colonies, the French established French colonies. This led to the cultural and lingual spread in the regions which they established the colonies.

According to the Canadian then-minister for La Francophonie Steven Blaney's speech in 2013, the International Francophonie Day is to "celebrate our commitment to not only the French language and the rich and diverse francophone culture but also the values of peace, democracy and respect for human rights that unite all members of the International Organization of La Francophonie".

See also  
Francophone literature
Organisation internationale de la Francophonie 
UN French Language Day

References

External links 
 

International language observances
Organisation internationale de la Francophonie
March observances